Trappista is a traditional semi-hard cow's-milk cheese made in France, Belgium, Bosnia and Herzegovina and Hungary. It was created by the Trappist monks of Port-du-Salut Abbey in France.

History
The origins of the cheese can be traced back to the 18th-century monks of the French abbey of Port-du-Salut. The secret recipe found its way to Bosnia and Herzegovina with the arrival of  Cistercian Trappists and establishment of Mariastern Abbey, Banja Luka in 1869. The monks lent portions of their name, Trapisti, to the entire neighborhood, and left a prominent legacy in the area through the production of both this famous cheese and a beer.

Production and characteristic
Trappista is based on a secret recipe but is also produced on an industrial scale. The cheese melts easily and has a mild flavor. It has a pale yellowish color with sparsely distributed holes of 3–5 mm. It is typically packaged in red plastic foil. Typical packages include 1.5 kg large and 1/2 kg small "wheels", as well as various slices and blocks.

The original French recipe is still manufactured today, under the trademark name of Port-Salut or the common name of Saint-Paulin.

Popularity and consumption
Trappista is very popular in Hungary and Serbia, as well as in neighboring Bosnia and Herzegovina. This cheese is best consumed with fruits, wine, or as a melted topping on hot foods.

See also 
 Oka cheese, a Trappist cheese from Canada
 List of cheeses

References

Bosnia and Herzegovina cheeses
Bosnia and Herzegovina cuisine
Cow's-milk cheeses
Trappist cheeses